Sadan Rostaq-e Gharbi Rural District is a rural district (dehestan) in the Central District of Kordkuy County, Golestan Province, Iran. At the 2006 census, its population was 11,165, in 3,072 families.  The rural district has 9 villages.

References 

Rural Districts of Golestan Province
Kordkuy County